John Frederick Lees (1809 – 1867) was a British landowner and Liberal Conservative politician who represented Oldham in the House of Commons of the United Kingdom as a Member of Parliament from 1835 to 1837.

Biography
Lees was the grandson of a cotton manufacturer, a local mill-owner, mine-owner, and landowner: the Lord of the manor of Oldham and an Oxford graduate, but was dismissed as "a gentleman... qualified neither by age nor ability to fulfill the duties of a member of the imperial parliament" by the Manchester Times. Hansard reports him to have made no speeches in Parliament during his term.

Politics
Thanks to internal squabbles (principally over the desired relationship between the state and the Anglican church) amongst the Radicals of Oldham, he was elected as a 'Liberal Conservative' at a by-election caused by the death of William Cobbett, narrowly defeating John Morgan Cobbett (Cobbett's son) after another Radical candidate (Feargus O'Connor) withdrew on the first morning of the poll. Lees attributed his victory to the absence of the organised 'intimidation system' he claimed had been practiced in the previous contested election (that of 1832).  By the general election of 1837 the Radicals had regrouped, and Lees came bottom of the poll: this he attributed to the return of intimidation and 'exclusive dealing'.

References

External links 
 History of Parliament Online - LEES, John Frederick (1809-1867), of Werneth, Oldham, Lancs.  (currently (Feb 2016) at 'preview' status - password protected)

People from Oldham
UK MPs 1835–1837
Politics of the Metropolitan Borough of Oldham
1809 births
1867 deaths
Conservative Party (UK) MPs for English constituencies